Abortion in Benin is legally permitted "upon the request of the pregnant woman, voluntary termination of pregnancy can be allowed when the pregnancy is likely to aggravate or cause a situation of material, educational, professional or moral distress incompatible with the interest of the woman and/or the unborn child…" in the first 12 weeks of pregnancy.

Benin’s Parliament passed a new legal amendment to the Sexual Health and Reproduction (SRH) 2003 Law on Wednesday 20 October 2021. Under Benin's previous abortion law, which was passed in 2003, a woman can only terminate the pregnancy if her life is at risk, if the pregnancy is a result of incest or rape, or if the foetus has a particularly serious medical condition. A select list of experts were allowed to examine a pregnancy to determine whether the only option for saving the woman's life is to induce abortion. The law was created due to lobbying by doctors, supported by the country's minister for social affairs , and health minister , who have both worked as gynecologists. President Patrice Talon supported the law, and the legislators present during the final vote passed the law unanimously.

Impact of strict abortion laws 
Self-induced abortions have been growing in Benin, especially among students in high school or university, and the average age of abortion recipients is 19.

References 

Healthcare in Benin
Benin
Benin
Women's rights in Benin